Bois Forte Indian Reservation is an Indian reservation formed for the Bois Forte Band of Chippewa (or Zagaakwaandagowininiwag (Men of the Thick Woods) in the Ojibwe language).

Sections

The reservation is composed of three sections in northern Minnesota, United States:

The area of 162.872 sq mi (421.838 km²) surrounds Nett Lake in Koochiching and St. Louis counties. This section comprises Nett Lake, Koochiching County plus Nett Lake, St. Louis County.
This reservation was originally set aside for the Little Forks Band of Rainy River Saulteaux. Today, as the population have all relocated onto either the Nett Lake or to the Lake Vermilion Indian Reservation, this reservation is kept as a natural resources reserve for the band.
 The smallest section is the Lake Vermilion Indian Reservation (Ojibwe: Onamanii-zaaga'iganiing, "At the Lake with Red ochre"). Set aside by executive order, originally for the Lake Vermilion Band of Lake Superior Chippewa, today this reservation is one of the most accessible reservations for the Band. Consequently, the band operates Fortune Bay Resort Casino, The Wilderness at Fortune Bay golf course, and the Atisokanigamig (Legend House) Heritage Center out of this reservation.

The reservation's total land area is 199.605 sq mi (516.974 km²).

Demographics
As of the census of 2020, the combined population of Bois Forte Reservation and Off-Reservation Trust Land was 984. The racial makeup of the reservation and off-reservation trust land was 69.9% Native American, 22.8% White, 0.1% Black or African American, and 7.2% from two or more races. Ethnically, the population was 2.2% Hispanic or Latino of any race.

Broken down by reservation subdivision, the Lake Vermilion segment had 402 people, the Nett Lake segment had 344 people, the Deer Creek segment had 163, and there were 75 people on other trust land parcels. The Bois Forte Indian Reservation is a member of the Minnesota Chippewa Tribe, who in July 2007, reported 3,052 people enrolled in the Bois Forte Band.

History
The community first entered into a treaty with the United States in 1854 that set aside an undefined region around Lake Vermilion as a reservation. The regions at Nett Lake and Itasca County were officially established in an 1866 treaty, and the Lake Vermilion lands were defined in an 1881 executive order. Following the Nelson Act of 1889, the lands were surveyed and subdivided, but the U.S. federal government did not force tribe members to move to the White Earth Indian Reservation. Even so, allotment allowed timber companies and white settlers to acquire much of the land within the reservation boundaries. Only about 41% of the Nett Lake reservation was still tribally-owned by 1981. In 2022, the Conservation Fund returned  of forest land at Nett Lake to the Bois Forte Band.

50% of the reservation is wetland, and the 7,300 acre (30 km²) Nett Lake is said to be the largest producer of wild rice in the United States.

References

External links
 

American Indian reservations in Minnesota
Anishinaabe reservations and tribal-areas in the United States
Geography of Itasca County, Minnesota
Populated places in Koochiching County, Minnesota
Ojibwe reserves and reservations
Native American tribes in Minnesota
Populated places in St. Louis County, Minnesota

hr:Zagaakwaandagowininiwag